AXX may refer to:

 the ticker symbol of the Axia NetMedia company
 Axx, a group of Toyota transmissions
 the ISO 639-3 code of the Xârâgurè language
 Angel Fire Airport, in Angel Fire, New Mexico (Federal Aviation Administration Location Identifier)
 F/A-XX program (aka A-XX), a 21st-century U.S. Navy project to replace the F/A-18E/F 
 Sound BlasterAxx, the AXX line of computer speakers sold under the brand name Sound Blaster from Creative Labs

See also

 AX (disambiguation)
 A20 (disambiguation)